The 2012 NACAC Cross Country Championships took place on March 17, 2012.  The races were held at the Queen's Park Savannah in Port of Spain, Trinidad and Tobago.  A detailed report of the event was given for the IAAF.

Complete results were published.

Medallists

Medal table (unofficial)

Note: Totals include both individual and team medals, with medals in the team competition counting as one medal.

Participation
According to an unofficial count, 108 athletes (+ 1 guest) from 12 countries participated.

 (2)
 (3)
 (18)
 (1)
 (2)
 (2)
 (6)
 (15)
 México (9)
 (12)
 (18 + 1 guest)
 (20)

See also
 2012 in athletics (track and field)

References

NACAC Cross Country Championships
NACAC Cross Country Championships
NACAC Cross Country Championships
NACAC Cross Country Championships
Cross country running in Trinidad and Tobago